Albertia is a genus of rotifers belonging to the family Dicranophoridae.

The genus was first described by Dujardin in 1838.

Species:
 Albertia crystallina Schultze, 1851
 Albertia naidis
 Albertia ovagranulata Valovaya, 1991

References

Rotifer genera
Ploima